Givira tigrata is a moth in the family Cossidae. It is found in Costa Rica.

References

Givira
Moths described in 1911